Kenny Lyall (born  in Edinburgh) was a Scottish professional football player in the 1980s who is best known for his time with the Glasgow Rangers.

A midfielder, Lyall began his career with Rangers. Whilst at Ibrox he made 11 appearances. He joined Motherwell in 1983 and spent one season there making over 20 appearances. A brief season with St Johnstone was followed by a move to Brechin City, where he totaled 48 appearances from 1985 to 1988. In 1988, Lyall left the Scottish Football League to sign for Newtongrange Star.

In Lyall's career, he scored five goals in 105 total appearances.

External links

1963 births
Living people
Rangers F.C. players
Motherwell F.C. players
Association football midfielders
St Johnstone F.C. players
Brechin City F.C. players
Scottish footballers
Scottish Football League players